The molecular formula C9H12N2O6 (molar mass: 244.20 g/mol, exact mass: 244.0695 u) may refer to:

 Uridine
 Pseudouridine

Molecular formulas